Wood glue is an adhesive used to tightly bond pieces of wood together.  Many substances have been used as glues.

Types

Animal glue
Animal glue, especially hoof glue and hide glue, was the primary adhesive of choice for many types of woodworking, including furniture and lutherie, for many centuries. It is manufactured from rendered collagen from the skins (hides) or hooves of animals. It is chemically similar to edible gelatin and is non-toxic if ingested. Hide glue is still used today in specialized applications: musical instruments (lutherie), for replica furniture, and for conservation-grade repairs to antique woodwork. Glue above  strength requires excessive dilution and so leaves too little glue in joints for effective adhesion, so it is not commonly used. Liquid versions of hide glue are now available; typically they have urea added to keep the glue liquid at room temperature and to extend drying time. Examples of liquid hide glue are Old Brownie Glue or Titebond Liquid Hide. Hide glue does not creep. Hide glue joints are easy to repair, by just heating and adding more hide glue.

Urea-formaldehyde
Urea-formaldehyde resin adhesives feature a low effective cost, low cure temperatures, resistance to microorganisms and abrasion, and light color. It does not creep, and can be repaired with epoxy. It can rapidly deteriorate in hot, moist environments, releasing formaldehyde (a carcinogen).  Supplied as a fine white powder which is mixed with half its weight of cold water for use.  Mixed adhesive remains usable for around three hours depending on temperature.  Providing it is kept dry, un-used powder has a shelf-life of up to a year.  The adhesive has the ability to fill gaps between ill-fitting components.  A popular brand is Cascamite.

Resorcinol-formaldehyde
Resorcinol-formaldehyde resin glue is very strong and durable (resisting immersion in boiling water, mild acids, salt water, solvents, mold, fungus, ultraviolet, etc.). Historically, it was the dominant glue in exterior grade plywood manufacture and the production of wooden aircraft.  It must be mixed before use (liquid resin and powdered catalyst), is toxic, and has a dark purple cured color, which may not be acceptable in some uses. For many years, the Federal Aviation Administration (FAA) has stated that "Resorcinol is the only known adhesive recommended and approved for use in wooden aircraft structure and fully meets necessary strength and durability requirements" for certificated aircraft. However, in fact the vast majority of wooden aircraft built in recent decades (mostly amateur-built aircraft) instead use other types of adhesives (primarily epoxy resin systems), which offer greater strength and, even more importantly, much less criticality in perfect application technique. Most newer adhesives are much more tolerant to typical construction mistakes (such as small gaps or misalignments between parts) than resorcinol, which offers virtually no tolerance for such everyday construction situations. This can pose major difficulties, especially in complex assemblies. Resorcinol is, however, still used by some builders/restorers, and is commonly seen in vintage aircraft.

Phenol formaldehyde
Phenol formaldehyde resin is commonly used for making plywood. It is cured at elevated temperature and pressure.

Polyurethane
Polyurethane glue (trade names include Gorilla Glue and Excel) is becoming increasingly popular in the USA after being used for years in other countries. It bonds to textile fibers, metals, plastics, glass, sand, ceramics and rubber, in addition to wood. Polyurethane wood adhesives are normally prepolymers terminated with isocyanate groups. When exposed to moisture, isocyanates react with water and thus cure the adhesives. Therefore, one-component polyurethane adhesives are also named as moisture-cure polyurethanes. In addition, interactions between polyurethanes and wood polymers can significantly influence bond performance. Polyurethane glues expand when they cure, improving adhesion where the fit is not tight. Unlike PVA glues, they can be used to glue end grains.
However, in water-saturating tests, polyurethane bonds "were much less durable than the resorcinol bonds on both [Douglas-fir and yellow birch]."

Epoxy
Epoxy resin, usually as a two-part mix system, cures under a wider range of temperatures and moisture content than other glues, does not require pressure while curing, and has good gap-filling properties: near-perfect joints with very small gaps actually produce weaker bonds. Use of epoxy requires careful attention to the mixing ratio of the two parts. It bonds to most cured wood glues (except PVA). Epoxy can trigger long-term sensitivity (allergies) from overexposure, and is often expensive.

Cyanoacrylate
Cyanoacrylate (Crazy glue, Superglue, CA or CyA) is used mainly for small repairs, especially by woodturners. It bonds instantly, including to skin. Cured CA is essentially a plastic material. Versions are available that are able to wick into tight joints but bond with reduced strength (because much drips out and much soaks into the wood leaving very little on the surface for the bond), or thicker formulations (gel) which can fill very small gaps, do not flow out of the joint, and do not soak so quickly into wood. Thinner cyanoacrylate glue does not bond more quickly nor form shorter polymer chains than the gel version when used on wood. The chemical nature of wood significantly delays polymerization of cyanoacrylate. When it finally polymerizes in a wood joint, enough gel remains for a better bond than with the thin version. When using the gel, too much glue will weaken the resulting bond. Likewise, applying too little of the thin super glue will result in almost no glue at all remaining in a wood joint, causing a weak bond or no bond at all. Versions are also available that are foam safe (regular CA dissolves most plastic foams) which are usually also marketed as low odor. Cyanoacrylate is stiff but has a low shear strength (brittle) thus normal wood bending can break the bond in some applications. Often, too much adhesive is applied which leads to a much weaker bond. CA has quickly become the dominant adhesive used by builders of balsa wood models, where its strength far exceeds the base materials.

Casein
Casein glue is made from milk proteins.  It was used to make strong and robust joints in early aviation, and was ubiquitous in the form of "white glue" such as Elmer's Glue-All, but fell out of favor due to its susceptibility to attack by bacteria.

Polyvinyl acetate (PVA)

Polyvinyl acetate (PVA), also known as "white glue", "hobby and craft" or “school glue” is non-toxic, PH neutral, cheap and easy to use, and is therefore the most commonly used type of wood glue.  Joints should be tight-fitting and clamped during curing for maximum strength. PVAs remain flexible after they have cured, however will creep under constant load. Joints that were previously glued with PVA may be hard to repair since most glues (including PVA itself) do not adhere well to cured PVA glue. PVA glues are not waterproof, however type 2 PVAs are water resistant.

Aliphatic resin

Aliphatic resin, also known as "carpenter's glue" and "yellow glue," is a synthetic adhesive (in this case, an aliphatic compound) with a light yellow color and creamy texture used most frequently to bond together pieces of wood. Compared to other adhesives, it has low odor and flammability, good bonding strength, and moderate moisture resistance. Its faster set-time than white glues can make its use on complex projects difficult. It cures in approximately 24 hours, and results in a glue line that is either translucent, pale tan, or amber. Before it cures, it can be cleaned up with tap water (like white glue). Unlike white glue, its heat resistance and hardness when cured means it can be sanded, though it will not absorb wood stains applied on top of it. Excess resin must be sanded off or otherwise removed before staining. It has less tendency to "creep" (slide during clamping) than white glue. Aliphatic resin has a similar use profile and relative ultimate strength as PVA. The two glues differ in grip characteristics before initial set, with PVAs exhibiting more slip during assembly and yellow glue having more initial grip. Brands include Titebond and Lepage.

Contact cement
Contact cement for wood veneers.

Hot glue
Hot glue for temporary uses.

Usage 
Several wood glues have poor "gap-filling" ability, meaning they either soak into the wood and leave the gap empty, or remain to fill the gap but have little structural integrity. Therefore, woodworkers commonly use tight-fitting joints that need surprisingly little glue to hold large pieces of wood. Most wood glues need to be clamped while the glue sets. Epoxy resins and some other glues can be thickened with structural fillers (or with thicker formulations of the resin) to help fill gaps, however it is preferable to try to minimize gaps in the first place so the problem is not faced.

Mechanical resistance 
Fine Woodworking magazine ran a number of tests to evaluate the mechanical resistance of wood joints with different glues:

The type I PVA glue was Titebond III, a waterproof glue. The epoxy was from System Three. The PVA glue was Elmer's Carpenter's glue. The liquid hide glue was from Old Brown Glue. The hot hide glue was J.E. Moser's. The polyurethane was Gorilla brand.

See also 
 Carpenter

References